
Tweeling (meaning twin in Dutch and Afrikaans) is a small town situated 22 km from Frankfort in the Free State province of South Africa. The adjacent black township is named Mafahlaneng, or "place of twins". This region of the highveld is colloquially known as the Riemland, recalling a time when it was a favoured hunting ground of the early pioneers.

The town was established in 1920 on the two farms Tweelingspruit and Tweelingkop, their names derived from two similar looking hills just outside the town. It is situated just east of the Liebenbergsvlei River which is a conduit for water from the Lesotho Highlands Water Project.

Tweeling is the halfway mark of the annual Liebensbergvlei Canoe Marathon. The two day race starts near Reitz and halts 33 km downstream at Zorgvliet farm, near Tweeling. The second stage starts from Bruinswick farm north of town and ends at Frankfort.

People from Tweeling 
 Johan Heyns, theologian
 Sisi Ntombela, politician and sixth premier of the Free State
 Pakiso Mthembu, athlete, University of the Free State Sportsman of The Year 2019

Gallery

References

External links 

 Liebenbergsvlei, Dabulamanzi

Populated places in the Mafube Local Municipality
Populated places established in 1920